Cheiridiidae is a family of pseudoscorpions belonging to the order Pseudoscorpiones.

Genera:
 Apocheiridium Chamberlin, 1924
 Cheiridium Menge, 1855
 Cryptocheiridium Chamberlin, 1931
 Electrobisium Cockerell, 1917
 Leptocheiridium Mahnert & Schmidl, 2011
 Neocheiridium Beier, 1932
 Nesocheiridium Beier, 1957
 Pycnocheiridium Beier, 1964

References

Pseudoscorpions
Pseudoscorpion families